Margaret J. "Maggie" Osler (November 27, 1942 – September 15, 2010) was a historian and philosopher of early modern science and a professor of history at the University of Calgary.

Biography
Osler received a B.A. in philosophy from Swarthmore College in 1963, and M.A. (1966) and Ph.D. (1968) degrees from Indiana University in History and Philosophy of Science under the supervision of Richard S. Westfall.  The title of her dissertation was John Locke and Some Philosophical Problems in the Science of Boyle and Newton.  She held teaching appointments at Oregon State University, Harvey Mudd College, and Wake Forest University before coming to the University of Calgary in 1975. There, she rose through the ranks, being promoted to professor in 1995. In 1998, she was appointed adjunct professor in philosophy, and in 2002 adjunct professor of history at the University of Alberta.

Osler's work concentrated on the history and context of the scientific revolution and the relation of early modern science to religion.  Her work includes writings on Locke, Galileo, Descartes, Boyle, Newton, and Gassendi.

She was active in a number of academic societies, especially the History of Science Society, for which she served as secretary from 2001 until her death. She was president of the Canadian Society for the History and Philosophy of Science from 1987 to 1990. Osler served as editor for the Journal of the History of Philosophy, and was on the editorial board of a number of other journals.

Books

Other works

"The Intellectual Sources of Robert Boyle's Philosophy of Nature: Gassendi's Voluntarism and Boyle's Physico-Theological Project" (pages 178–198) in Philosophy, Science, and Religion in England, 1640-1700, Richard W. F. Kroll, Richard Ashcraft, Perez Zagorin, Cambridge University Press, 1991, 287 pages

"Certainty, Scepticism, and Scientific Optimism: The Roots of Eighteenth-Century Attitudes Toward Scientific Knowledge" (pp. 3–28) in Probability, Time, and Space in Eighteenth-century Literature, Paula R. Backscheider, Modern Language Association of America, AMS Press, 1979, 307 pages

"Descartes and Charleton on Nature and God" in J. Hist. Ideas Volume 40, 1979, pages 445–456.

References

External links
 Eloge from ISIS, A Journal of the History of Science Society
 Notice at the University of Calgary Faculty of Arts website
 Obituary
 The Margaret Osler Papers at Oregon State University Libraries

20th-century Canadian historians
Canadian historians of philosophy
Historians of science
Academic staff of the University of Calgary
2010 deaths
1942 births
Canadian women academics
Canadian women historians
21st-century Canadian historians